Vasilios Babis (born 22 October 1996) is a Greek professional footballer who plays as a left-back.

Honours
Irodotos
Heraklion FCA Championship: 2016–17
Heraklion FCA Cup: 2016–17
Greek Amateur Cup: 2016–17
Greek Amateurs' Super Cup: 2016–17

References

1996 births
Living people
Football League (Greece) players
Gamma Ethniki players
OFI Crete F.C. players
Irodotos FC players
O.F. Ierapetra F.C. players
Association football defenders
Footballers from Heraklion
Greek footballers